The Cholistan University of Veterinary and Animal Sciences (CUVAS) is a public university located in Bahawalpur, Punjab, Pakistan. It was established in 2014 on the initiative of Chief Minister Punjab, Muhammad Shahbaz Sharif.

Programs
The university offers the following programs:

Undergraduate programs
Doctor of Veterinary Medicine (DVM)
BS Animal Sciences 
BS Applied Microbiology 
BS Biochemistry
BS Biological Sciences
BS Food Science and Technology
BS Medical Laboratory Technology 
BS Poultry Science
BS Zoology
Bs Human Nutrition and Dietetics
Bs Chemistry
Bs Biotechnology
Bs Computer science
Bachelor of Business Administration

Diploma programs
Livestock Assistant Diploma (LAD)
Poultry Assistant Diploma (PAD)
Artificial Insemination Technician (AIT)
Dairy Farm Manager (DFM)
Poultry Farm Manager (PFM)
Village Veterinary Worker (VVW)
ICT based Livestock Education (Online)

Postgraduate Programs(Morning)
M. Phil Animal Nutrition
M. Phil Biochemistry
M. Phil Livestock Management
M. Phil Microbiology 
M. Phil Poultry Science
M. Phil Zoology
PhD Zoology

See also
 University of Veterinary and Animal Sciences, Lahore
 Fisheries Research and Training Institute, Lahore
 College of Veterinary and Animal Sciences, Jhang

References

External links
 CUVAS official website

Public universities and colleges in Punjab, Pakistan
Veterinary schools in Pakistan
Educational institutions established in 2014
2014 establishments in Pakistan
Universities and colleges in Bahawalpur